Thomas Jennison Parmley (November 2, 1897 – September 15, 1997) was an American physics professor at the University of Utah. He served as chairman of the UofU's physics department from 1957 to 1963.

Parmley was born in Scofield, Utah to William and Mary Veal Parmley. His father was killed in the Scofield Mine disaster in that town in 1900. In 1921, he received his bachelor's degree from the University of Utah where he was a founding member of the Sigma Pi fraternity chapter.  While still being an undergraduate, he worked as a chemist for the U.S. Smeltering Company.  In 1923 he married LaVern W. Parmley who served as general president of the Primary of the Church of Jesus Christ of Latter-day Saints (LDS Church). He then earned his Ph.D. from Cornell University in 1927.  Prior to joining the faculty of the University of Utah, Parmley was involved in cyclotron research at the University of California, Berkeley. While there he was the lead author of the paper "The Radioactives of some high-mass isotopes of Cobalt"

Parmley was a member of the LDS Church. He served for 13 years on the General Board of the Deseret Sunday School Union.

Parmley was involved with the Atomic Energy Commission and the National Bureau of Standards.  He was a member of the American Institute of Physics.

Among Parmley's students at the University of Utah were Don Lind and prominent cardiac surgeon and LDS Apostle Russell M. Nelson.

One of the main physics lecture halls at the University of Utah is named after him as is a scholarship. Parmley's son William became a general authority in the LDS Church.

Although Parmley retired from formal teaching in 1980, his zeal for learning and expanding the minds of young people persisted though his whole life. He appreciated science, learning, and discovery, but his true passion was for teaching and helping young students experience the excitement of learning and discovery. If you asked him, assuredly he would list his greatest accomplishments as the lives of his children and accomplishments of his students. His influence continues today in those who knew his kindness, generosity, faith and his amazing enthusiasm for life and learning.

In 1996 he was name the university's Centennial Professor.

Notes

References
Church News, August 11, 1990
Obituary. Deseret News, 17 Sep., 1997

1897 births
1997 deaths
American leaders of the Church of Jesus Christ of Latter-day Saints
20th-century American physicists
Cornell University alumni
People from Carbon County, Utah
Sunday School (LDS Church) people
University of California, Berkeley faculty
University of Utah alumni
University of Utah faculty
Latter Day Saints from Utah